Compañía General de Tabacos de Filipinas v. Collector of Internal Revenue, 275 US 87 (1927) is a US tax law case during the Lochner era of the US Supreme Court.

Facts

A Spanish corporation, Compañía General de Tabacos de Filipinas, claimed that a tax on goods it shipped was unlawfully imposed by the Collector of Internal Revenue. The company bought goods, stored them in a Philippine warehouse, and notified the value to its Barcelona head office, which insured them through a company in London. The company claimed a tax statute of the Philippines was contrary to the Act of Congress of August 29, 1916, c. 416, § 3 (the Jones Act), 39 Stat. 545, 546, 547, as depriving it of its property without due process of law, and also as departing from the requirement in the same section that the rules of taxation shall be uniform.

The Supreme Court of the Philippines upheld the tax.

Judgment
The US Supreme Court held that the tax was lawful.

Holmes J dissented on reasoning, not result, joined by Brandeis J.

See also
United States tax law

Notes

References

United States taxation and revenue case law